Thomas Walker Rush (born February 8, 1941) is an American folk and blues singer, guitarist and songwriter who helped launch the careers of other singer-songwriters in the 1960s and has continued his own singing career for 60 years.

Life and career 
Rush was born in Portsmouth, New Hampshire, United States, the son of a teacher at St. Paul's School, in Concord, New Hampshire. He began performing in 1961 while studying at Harvard University, after having graduated from the Groton School. He majored in English literature. His early recordings include Southern and Appalachian folk or old-time country songs, Woody Guthrie ballads, and acoustic-guitar blues, such as Jesse Fuller's "San Francisco Bay Blues," which appeared on both of his first two LPs. He regularly performed at the Club 47 coffeehouse (now called Club Passim) in Cambridge, the Unicorn in Boston, and The Main Point in Bryn Mawr, Pennsylvania. In the 1970s he lived in Deering, New Hampshire.

Rush is credited by Rolling Stone magazine with ushering in the era of the singer-songwriter. In addition to performing his own compositions, he sang songs by Joni Mitchell, Jackson Browne, James Taylor, Murray McLauchlan, David Wiffen and William Hawkins, helping them to gain recognition early in their careers.

His 1968 composition "No Regrets" has become a standard, with numerous cover versions having been recorded (Rush did two radically different versions himself).  These include The Walker Brothers, who gave Tom Rush Top Ten credit as a songwriter on the UK Singles Chart, Emmylou Harris, who included the song on her 1988 album Bluebird, and Midge Ure whose cover also made the UK Top Ten.

On March 1, 2007 a video of his performance of Steven Walters' "The Remember Song" was uploaded to YouTube, and, as of April 2017, it has received over 7 million plays. Writing on his website, Rush said,

One of the earliest music videos produced (1968) for an artist by a record company, Elektra, can be found at his website. It was used to promote his signature song, "No Regrets", for his The Circle Game album. A number of recent videos from a 2010 concert performed in Old Saybrook, Connecticut can be found online.

Tom Rush is married to author Renée Askins and was formerly married to singer Beverly Rush.

Over the years Rush has used a number of guitars on stage, his current primary one being a handcrafted acoustic made by Don Musser. In February 2012, Rush appeared on stage in Colorado with a new instrument, a cedar-top Dreadnought with an inlay of a snake wrapped around a reclining nude woman. The guitar, crafted by McKenzie & Marr Guitars is a "re-incarnation" of one of Rush's earliest acoustics, the famous "Naked Lady".

On December 28, 2012, Rush appeared at Boston Symphony Hall to celebrate fifty years in the music business.

Rush's latest album Voices was released in 2018. In recent years, he has frequently toured the United States, often accompanied on piano by Berklee graduate Matt Nakoa.

Discography 

 1962 Tom Rush at the Unicorn (Lycornu)
 1964 Got a Mind to Ramble (Prestige)
 1965 Blues, Songs & Ballads (Prestige)
 1965 Tom Rush (Elektra)
 1966 Take a Little Walk with Me (Elektra)
 1968 The Circle Game (Elektra)
 1970 Tom Rush (Columbia)
 1970 Wrong End of the Rainbow (Columbia)
 1972 Merrimack County (Columbia)
 1974 Ladies Love Outlaws (Columbia)
 1982 New Year (Night Light)
 1984 Late Night Radio (Night Light)
 2001 Live at Symphony Hall, Boston (Varese Sarabande)
 2006 Trolling for Owls (Late Night)
 2009 What I Know (Appleseed)
 2013 Celebrates 50 Years of Music (Appleseed)
 2018 Voices (Appleseed)

References

External links 
 
 
 

1941 births
Living people
American folk singers
American singer-songwriters
Harvard University alumni
People from Portsmouth, New Hampshire
Elektra Records artists
Appalachian music
People from Deering, New Hampshire